The Shirez Canyon is a canyon of geotouristic importance, located 45 kilometers northeast of Kuhdasht, the capital of Kuhdasht County, in the province of Lurestan, western Iran.

The valley's springs join the stream of Seimare, which is a branch of the Karkhen River.

Shirez canyon formation 
Shirez canyon is located in the heart of the Zagros Mountains with all its beauties. The valley is eroded with sedimentary rocks belonging to the third geological Devon.

Shirez canyon historical and geographical value 
Shirez canyon in Lurestan also have ancient sites of the Stone Age. These sites also include works from the cave life that attracted many attentions.

References

Canyons and gorges of Iran
Landforms of Lorestan Province